Ajjamuru is a village in West Godavari district in the state of Andhra Pradesh in India. akiveedu railway station is the nearest Railway Station.

Demographics
 India census, Ajjamuru has a population of 1811 of which 954 are males while 857 are females. The average sex ratio of Ajjamuru village is 898. The child population is 136, which makes up 7.51% of the total population of the village, with sex ratio 659. In 2011, the literacy rate of Ajjamuru village was 77.91% when compared to 67.02% of Andhra Pradesh.

See also 
 West Godavari district

References 

Villages in West Godavari district